Voices is a 1979 film directed by Robert Markowitz and starring Michael Ontkean and Amy Irving. It features a score by songwriter Jimmy Webb.

Plot
Rosemarie Lemon is a young deaf woman and teacher of deaf children whose dream of becoming a dancer is not supported by her mother (Viveca Lindfors). Drew Rothman is a truck driver working for the family business whose ambition to become a singer is ridiculed by his brother and father, who all live with the grandfather in an apartment in Hoboken, New Jersey.

Drew becomes fascinated with Rosemarie after first seeing her in a train station. After tracking her down, he soon learns about her hearing impairment, but becomes fascinated with how she navigates life with the inability to hear, especially since music is Drew’s true passion.  When Rosemarie and Drew start seeing each other, their relationship is strengthened by their ambitions and the need for support that they share.

Despite initial criticism and commentary from Rosemarie's mother and Drew's father and brother, the couple manages to learn more about each other's world and become closer.  In the end, they give each the love and confidence to succeed in achieving their dreams.

Cast
Michael Ontkean as Drew Rothman
Amy Irving as Rosemarie Lemon
Alex Rocco as Frank Rothman
Herbert Berghof as Nathan Rothman
Barry Miller as Raymond Rothman
Allan Rich as Montrose Meier
Viveca Lindfors as Mrs. Lemon

See also
List of films featuring the deaf and hard of hearing

References

External links

1979 films
Films about deaf people
Films about singers
Films set in New Jersey
Films directed by Robert Markowitz
Metro-Goldwyn-Mayer films
1979 directorial debut films
1970s English-language films